Martha Masters (born 23 September 1972) is an American classical guitarist. She won the 2000 Guitar Foundation of America international solo competition. Masters is the President of the GFA.

She received both Bachelor and Master of Music degrees from the Peabody Conservatory in Baltimore, where she studied with Manuel Barrueco, and completed the Doctor of Musical Arts degree at the University of Southern California as a student of Scott Tennant.

Masters was born in Fairborn, Ohio. She is currently a professor and guitar instructor at Loyola Marymount University in Los Angeles, California, where she also directs the LMU Guitar Ensemble.

Discography
 Serenade (The Orchard, 2000)
 Guitar Recital (Naxos, 2001)
 Musings (GSP, 2005) with Risa Carlson as Duo Erato
 Viaggio in Italia (GSP, 2006)
 Viaje in Espana (GSP, 2009)

Video
 GFA Winner 2000 (Mel Bay)

References

External links
Official web site
Interview at Classical Guitar magazine
General Manager of the Guitar Foundation of America
Tokafi Interview

1972 births
American classical guitarists
Living people
Peabody Institute alumni
USC Thornton School of Music alumni
Women classical guitarists
21st-century American women guitarists
21st-century American guitarists